The Stade de France is the national stadium of France, located just north of Paris in the commune of Saint-Denis. Its seating capacity of 80,698 makes it the sixth-largest stadium in Europe. The stadium is used by the France national football team and France rugby union team for international competition. It is the largest in Europe for track and field events, seating 78,338 in that configuration. Despite that, the stadium's running track is mostly hidden under the football pitch. Originally built for the 1998 FIFA World Cup, the stadium's name was recommended by Michel Platini, head of the organising committee. On 12 July 1998, France defeated Brazil 3–0 in the 1998 FIFA World Cup Final contested at the stadium. It will host the athletics events at the 2024 Summer Olympics. It will also host matches for the 2023 Rugby World Cup. After the 2022 Russian invasion of Ukraine, it was announced that the 2022 UEFA Champions League Final would be moved from the Gazprom Arena to the Stade de France. 

The Stade de France, listed as a Category 4 stadium by UEFA, hosted matches at the 1998 FIFA World Cup, the UEFA Champions League finals in 2000, 2006 and 2022. As well as the 1999 and 2007 Rugby World Cup, making it one of only two stadia in the world to have hosted both a Football World Cup final and a rugby union World Cup final (along with Nissan Stadium in Yokohama). It also hosted seven matches at UEFA Euro 2016, including the final, where France lost to Portugal 1-0 after extra-time. The facility also hosted the Race of Champions auto race in 2004, 2005, and 2006. The stadium hosted the 2003 World Championships in Athletics and from 1999 to 2016 it hosted the annual Meeting Areva athletics meet.

Domestically, the Stade de France serves as a secondary home facility of Parisian rugby clubs Stade Français and Racing 92, hosting a few of their regular-season fixtures. The stadium also hosts the main French domestic cup finals, which include the Coupe de France (both football and rugby), Coupe de la Ligue, Challenge de France, and the Coupe Gambardella, as well as the Top 14 rugby union championship match.

The facility is owned and operated by the Consortium Stade de France.

History 

The discussion of a national stadium in France came about as a result of the country's selection to host the 1998 FIFA World Cup on 2 July 1992. As a result of the selection, the country and the French Football Federation made a commitment to construct an 80,000+ capacity all-seater stadium with every seat in the facility being covered. It was the first time in over 70 years since the construction of the Stade Olympique Yves-du-Manoir that a stadium in France was being constructed for a specific event. Due to the magnitude and importance of the facility, the Council of State was allowed first hand approach to how the stadium would be constructed and paid for. The Council sought for the stadium to be built as close as possible to the capital of France, Paris, and that the constructor and operator of the facility would receive significant financial contribution for a period of 30 months following the completion of the stadium. The stadium's design was handled by the team of architects composed of Michel Macary, Aymeric Zublena, Michel Regembal, and Claude Constantini who were associated with CR SCAU Architecture.

The stadium was officially ready for construction following the government's selection of manufacturers, Bouygues, Dumez, and SGE, and the signing of building permits on 30 April 1995. With only 31 months to complete the stadium, construction commenced on 2 May 1995. The laying of the first cornerstone took place five months later on 6 September. After over a year of construction, over 800,000 m² of earthworks had been created and as much as 180,000 m³ of concrete had been poured. The installation of the roof, which cost €45 million, and the mobile platform also took more than a year to complete.

During the developmental phase, the stadium was referred to in French as the Grand Stade ("large stadium" or "great stadium"). On 4 December 1995, the Ministry of Sport launched a design competition to decide on a name for the stadium. The stadium was officially named the Stade de France after the Ministry heard a proposal from French football legend Michel Platini, who recommended the name. The total cost of the stadium was €364 million.

The stadium was inaugurated on 28 January 1998 as it hosted a football match between France and Spain. The match was played in front of 78,368 spectators, which included President Jacques Chirac, with France winning the match 1–0 with Zinedine Zidane scoring the lone goal, and the first-ever in the Stade de France, in the 20th minute. Six months later, France returned to the stadium and defeated Brazil in the 1998 FIFA World Cup Final to earn their first World Cup title. Stade de France has hosted group, quarter-final, semi-final and the final match of 1998 FIFA World Cup. The national rugby team's first match in the facility was contested five days after its opening, on 2 February, with France earning a 24–17 win over England in front of 77,567 spectators. Philippe Bernat-Salles converted the first ever try at the stadium scoring it in the 11th minute of play.

On 24 May 2000, the Stade de France hosted the 2000 UEFA Champions League Final. In the match, which saw 78,759 spectators attend, Spanish club Real Madrid defeated fellow Spaniards Valencia 3–0. In 2003, the Stade de France was the primary site of the 2003 World Championships in Athletics. Three years later in 2006, the facility hosted another UEFA Champions League final with another Spanish club Barcelona defeating England's Arsenal 2–1. On 9 May 2009, the Stade de France set the national attendance record for a sporting match played in France with 80,832 showing up to watch Guingamp upset Brittany rivals Rennes 2–1 in the 2009 Coupe de France Final. On 22 May 2010, the Stade de France hosted the 2010 Heineken Cup Final. On 11 February 2012, a Six Nations international rugby game between France and Ireland had to be cancelled just before kick-off due to the pitch freezing as the stadium lacks under-soil heating.

On 13 November 2015, in one of a series of coordinated shootings and bombings across Paris, the Stade de France was targeted. Two explosions occurred outside the stadium during an international friendly between France and Germany, with French President François Hollande in attendance. The terrorist, however, was unable to enter the stadium. The explosion was heard inside the stadium, and many thought it was a firework going off inside the stadium. The attacker wanted to infiltrate the stadium, but was scared away when he saw security and was forced to detonate outside the park. The authorities, aware of what had occurred outside the stadium, chose to continue the match out of concerns that cancelling the match would have caused a panic. The stadium has since improved its counter-attack training and strengthened its security.  There have since been new guidelines issued by the French police, with mixed reactions.

In 2016, the Stade de France was used as the central stadium for the 2016 Euros hosting seven matches. The stadium was used for the opening ceremony of the tournament which saw French DJ David Guetta perform at the stadium. At the end of his set, Guetta invited Swedish singer Zara Larsson on stage to perform the tournament's official song "This One's for You". Following the ceremony the stadium was used for the tournament's opening game which saw France beat Romania 2–1. Across the next month, the stadium was used for six other tournament matches including the UEFA Euro 2016 Final between France and Portugal. The match followed the closing ceremony which again saw David Guetta perform. Portugal defeated France, 1–0 in extra time, winning the tournament for the first time.

The 2022 UEFA Champions League Final, between Liverpool F.C. and Real Madrid CF, was delayed because of difficulties admitting fans. Gérald Darmanin, the French interior minister, blamed only Liverpool fans, claiming that Liverpool fans were out of control and trying to enter the stadium with bogus tickets. French police used tear gas and pepper spray to try to break up crowds. The chairman of the Liverpool Disabled Supporters Association told the French Senate that "Disabled fans were treated like animals." Fans attempting to leave the stadium were attacked by local residents. Supporters, journalists, and political figures have disputed French authorities' claims. UEFA has commissioned an independent report into the event.

Architecture

The Stade de France has a movable stand which can be retracted to uncover part of the athletics track. The stadium was notably designed with the assistance of a software simulation of crowd in order to get an accurate observation of how it would look fully developed. The facility was also intended to draw interest in and develop the area of the Plaine Saint-Denis, which straddle the communes of Saint-Denis, Aubervilliers, and Saint-Ouen. The primary goal was to renovate the area by building new residential and tertiary sites.

The stadium was built without any undersoil heating as noted when Ireland were due to play France in the Six Nations Tournament rugby union match of 2012, in which the game had to be canceled.

In 2002, the International Association for Bridge and Structural Engineering (IABSE) awarded a prize recognizing the unique structure of the Stade de France commenting that the Stade de France exhibited "a construction of an attractive open architecture of the city, with an elegance and natural lightness".

Roof

Construction of the Stade de France's roof cost over €45 million. Its elliptical shape symbolizes the universality of sport in France. Its area of six hectares and weight, 13,000 tons, is considered a technical marvel by many. It was designed to easily protect the 80,000 spectators without covering the playing field. All lighting and sound, which include 550 lights and 36 blocks of 5 speakers, are housed inside to avoid obstructing visibility. The tinted glass in the center reduces the contrast and distributes natural light. It filters out red and infrared radiation, however, it allows blue and green lights, due to their necessity involving the health of the turf.

Interior

Stands
The Stade de France is the biggest modular stadium in the world with three galleries.

The forum is a low mobile platform of 25,000 seats. It is reached by level 1. It may fall 15 feet to reveal all of the running track and jumping pits. It then retains 22,000 seats. The movement lasts 80 hours, 40 people 20h/24h mobilized, and carried by ten distinct elements of 700 tons each.

Access to the gallery is through with 22 bridges and can be found at level 3 with a concentration of restaurants, entertainment areas, shops and central station security.

18 staircases lead viewers to the upper gallery located at Level 6.

The evacuation of 80,000 spectators on the porch out can occur in less than 15 minutes.

Field
Located at 11 meters below the court, the playing area measures 9,000 square meters (120 meters long and 75 meters wide) to a grassed area of 11,000 square meters. Nearly one billion seeds were sown to produce the first pitch in 1997. Today, the grass comes in rolls of 1.20 m x 8 m. Changing the pitch calls for three days of preparation and five days of installation. The change takes place several times a year, depending on the programming stage.
Unlike many other stadiums, the Stade de France was built without under pitch heating, as the stadium was constructed on the site of an old gasworks, and there were concerns it could cause an explosion.

Giant screens
As part of its policy of renewing its infrastructure, the Stade de France added two new big screens in September 2006. The new displays have a surface 58% greater than the previous screens installed in 1998. The newer giant screens are each composed of 4,423,680 light emitting diodes. They have faster response time and are brighter than the previous screens.

Major sports matches
Sporting events held at the Stade de France include matches (preliminary contests as well as finals) of the 1998 FIFA World Cup, 2003 FIFA Confederations Cup, 2007 Rugby World Cup and UEFA Euro 2016. The 2023 Rugby World Cup, including the final, is also planned for the venue. It also hosted the 2022 UEFA Champions League Final after being moved from the Gazprom Arena in Russia due to the Russian invasion of Ukraine.

Concerts

The stadium is also used for music concerts. The Rolling Stones, Beyoncé, Depeche Mode, Coldplay, Metallica, Muse, Prince, U2, Guns N' Roses, Rihanna, AC/DC, Justin Timberlake, Céline Dion, Bruno Mars, The Black Eyed Peas, Booba, Tina Turner, Jay Z, Red Hot Chili Peppers, One Direction, Eminem, Lady Gaga, Paul McCartney, Roger Waters, Madonna, The Police, and BTS have performed here.

Noise record
On 12 May 2012, the French heavy metal band Gojira performed at the stadium as the opening act for Metallica during their European Black Album Tour. Gojira's concert was measured at 120 decibels in the corridors backstage, which broke the record for the loudest sound ever recorded at the Stade de France.

On 11 April 2015, the crowd noise produced by the 80,000 people at the Stade de France during the 2015 Coupe de la Ligue Final reached 109 decibels, which set the world record for the noisiest stadium recorded during a final match of a football tournament.

Tenants
The Stade de France has as a regular tenant only the national football and national rugby teams. Repeated attempts to persuade a professional football or rugby team to move there have failed so far. Upon the construction of the stadium, Paris Saint-Germain declined to move there, choosing to remain at the Parc des Princes under pressure from its then-owner (pay-TV network Canal Plus) and the Paris city government.

However, the Paris rugby club Stade Français have now established themselves as a semi-regular tenant. They began by scheduling their Top 14 home fixture on 15 October 2005 against Toulouse at Stade de France. Stade Français's president, Max Guazzini, publicly said that the club would have to sell 25,000 to 30,000 tickets to break even. Three weeks before the match, 61,000 tickets had been sold, setting a French record for tickets sold to a league match for any sport, including football. The final attendance was 79,454, smashing the national attendance record for a league match in any sport by more than 20,000. Five minutes before the end of the Toulouse match, Guazzini announced to the crowd that Stade Français's scheduled home fixture against Biarritz in March 2006 would also be held at Stade de France. The Stade-Biarritz match broke the attendance record from earlier in the season, with 79,604 present.

Guazzini then booked the Stade de France for the same two league fixtures in 2006–07. The Biarritz match on 16 October 2006 drew 79,619, making this the third consecutive Stade Français fixture at the Stade de France to set an all-time French attendance record. The record was broken yet again at a match against Toulouse on 27 January 2007, with 79,741 filling the stands. Stade Français went on to schedule three home matches at Stade de France in the 2007–08 season. For the 2008–09 season, they booked Stade de France for three home league matches and a Heineken Cup pool match. The number of Stade Français home matches at Stade de France increased again for 2009–10, with five Top 14 fixtures already announced for the stadium.

Even with the lack of a regular league tenant, the stadium's revenue increased greatly in 2007, as it was used extensively during the 2007 Rugby World Cup in France, where it hosted numerous pool matches, a quarterfinal match, both of the semi finals and the final.

The Lille OSC football team played all its "home" games in European competition during the 2005–06 season, both in the UEFA Champions League and the UEFA Cup, at the Stade de France because its own stadium was then under renovation, and the only nearer alternative on French soil, Stade Félix-Bollaert, was not available as that ground's occupant, Lille's local rival Lens, was also participating in the UEFA Cup. The Stade de France has hosted the Champions League final on three occasions: 2000 (Real Madrid 3 Valencia 0), 2006 (Barcelona 2 Arsenal 1), and 2022 (Real Madrid 1 Liverpool 0),

Future developments
France's governing body for rugby union, the French Rugby Federation (FFR), announced in November 2010 that it would not renew its deal to use Stade de France for international rugby matches when it expires in 2013. FFR also stated that it planned to build a new stadium of its own in the Paris region.

Reportedly, the FFR had become increasingly frustrated with several aspects of the deal. According to rugby journalist Ian Moriarty, "The deal with the Stade de France has been a disaster for the FFR financially over the years, forcing France's powerbrokers to look across the English channel at the RFU's Twickenham cash cow with ever increasing envy." Reports vary widely as to how much the FFR must spend to rent out the stadium, but estimates range from €3 million to €5 million per match. Although the Stade de France and Twickenham are roughly the same size, the rental expense means that the FFR reportedly makes about one-third as much from a Stade de France sellout as does the RFU from a sellout at Twickenham. In addition, the national rugby team does not enjoy primacy at the Stade de France; the national football team and major concerts take priority. FFR had to move two of its 2010–11 home Tests to Montpellier and Nantes due to fixture clashes with the national football team. Also, former FFR president Serge Blanco claimed that the 2009 Top 14 final had to be moved from May to June because of a conflict with a Johnny Hallyday rock concert.

In June 2012, FFR announced that it had selected the site for its new ground, tentatively known as Grand Stade FFR. The new stadium, estimated to cost €600 million, was originally scheduled to open in 2017, but completion was later pushed back to the 2021/2022 time frame. FFR officially abandoned the stadium project in December 2016.

Access
Although located at the crossroads of auto-routes A1 and A86, it is not advisable to go there by car unless one has reserved parking. The stadium was built with a very limited number of parking spaces, which is why public transportation is considered the primary means of getting to the stadium. River shuttles are provided by the Canal Saint-Denis.

As part of the Grand Paris Express project and 2024 Olympic and Paralympic Games, a new station at Saint-Denis Pleyel is under construction, connected by a bridge to the Stade de France–Saint-Denis station. Initially served by Line 14 in time for the Games, the station will eventually serve 4 different Métro lines.

References

External links

 
 Stadium Guide Article
 Stats for all rugby matches played at the Stade de France
 Rugby World Cup 2007
 Le Stade de France 3D model (GoogleSketchup) 

Athletics (track and field) venues in France
1998 FIFA World Cup stadiums
2003 FIFA Confederations Cup stadiums
Football venues in France
National stadiums
Multi-purpose stadiums in France
Rugby World Cup stadiums
Rugby union stadiums in France
Sports venues in Seine-Saint-Denis
Sports venues in Paris
Stade Français
France national football team
UEFA Euro 2016 stadiums
Stadiums that have hosted a FIFA World Cup opening match
Sport in Saint-Denis, Seine-Saint-Denis
November 2015 Paris attacks
Sports venues completed in 1998
1998 establishments in France
Venues of the 2024 Summer Olympics
Olympic stadiums
Olympic athletics venues
UEFA European Championship final stadiums
France national rugby union team
Music venues completed in 1998
Diamond League venues